The ELF Cup (Equality, Liberty, Fraternity) was an international football tournament organised by the Cyprus Turkish Football Federation (KTFF), a member of the NF-Board. It was played only once in 2006. Among the participants were NF-Board teams, and  FIFA member teams from the Asian Football Confederation.

ELF Cup 2006

The 2006 ELF Cup took place in the North Cyprus between November 19 and 25. Initially announced for non-FIFA teams only, the 2006 tournament also found places for three teams from the Asian Football Confederation - Tajikistan, Kyrgyzstan and Afghanistan. However, under pressure from FIFA, Afghanistan withdrew from the tournament.

Controversy
Initially, it was announced that the North Cyprus were to hold the inaugural VIVA World Cup tournament, organised by the NF-Board as a bi-annual competition for the best non-FIFA nations. However, a dispute between the NF-Board and a new regime at the KTFF led to the tournament being taken away and granted to Occitania. The NF-Board claimed that the new government of the North Cyprus insisted on restricting which nations could and could not take part. The KTFF, however, claimed that the NF-Board made unreasonable financial demands.

In response, the KTFF announced that the ELF Cup would be held at the same time as the VIVA World Cup, and have promised to pay travelling expenses to the participants, which has attracted some NF-Board members. The KTFF hope that the tournament will bring North Cyprus further into the international arena.

Competitors
 – representing the Crimean Tatars.
 – Gagauzia, an autonomous region of Moldova.
 – an autonomous region of Denmark, and nominally under the control of the Danish Football Association and is a NF-Board member.
 – a member of the AFC and FIFA, represented here by their futsal team.
 – a member of the AFC and FIFA, represented here by their futsal team.
 – an autonomous region of China, fiercely independent in exile and is a NF-Board member.
 – the hosts, an internationally unrecognised state and is a NF-Board member.
 – autonomous region of Tanzania, but with membership of the CAF and of the NF-Board, represented here by their under-20 national team.

Results
The eight participants were drawn into two groups of four, with the top two from each group progressing to the knockout stage. For details of the squads, see 2006 ELF Cup Squads.

Group A

Group B

Semi-finals

3rd Place Playoff

Final

Golden Team

Scorers

6 goals

 Ertaç Taşkıran

5 goals

 Hamis Çakır

4 goals

 Ulan Riskulov

3 goals

 Jenish Mamatov
 Daler Aknazarov
 Kemal Uçaner
 Ediz Çukurovalı
 Muhammed Seif Muhammed

2 goals

 Piotr Marcov
 Marlen Akimov
 Mihail Sundeev
 Derviş Kolcu
 Sabri Selden
 Coşkun Ulusoy

1 goal

 İrfan Ametov
 Ablâmetov Arsen
 Ebubekirov Fevziy
 Halil Hayredinov
 Emiratlı Ruslan
 Denis Ceavdari
 Niklas Kreutzmann
 Pelle Mortensen
 Kristian Sandgreen
 Mustafayev Arsen
 Dilshat Kadyrov
 Vadim Kondratkov
 Sundeev Mihail
 Sergey Almukhamedov

 Firdavs Faizullaev
 Atkun Arıkbuka
 Yasin Kansu
 Ekrem Keleşzade
 Hasan Sapsızoğlu
 Rajab Rashid Omar
 Suleiman Kassim Suleiman

Own goals
  Rizvan Ablitarov (playing against TRNC)

Trivia
 All the matches were played with Adidas Teamgeist balls.

See also
Non-FIFA football
VIVA World Cup
FIFI Wild Cup
CONIFA
Foreign relations of Northern Cyprus

Notes

External links
  Official site
  ELF Cup kicks off
  News about the Tibetan team
  Pictures from the tournament

 
2006 in Northern Cyprus
2006 in association football
Football competitions in Northern Cyprus
Non-FIFA football competitions
Northern Cyprus national football team
2006 in Tajikistani football
2006 in Kyrgyzstani football
Greenland national football team